Lisa Margrit Wilcox (born September 8, 1966 in Thousand Oaks, California) is an equestrian riding instructor best known for her success in dressage.  Lisa has won ribbons in approximately 660 competitions, including the team silver medal at the FEI World Equestrian Games in 2002 and a bronze medal in team dressage in the 2004 summer olympics.

Though Wilcox is originally from Colorado, in 1994 she moved to Germany to train under Herbert Rehbein and has spent the majority of her time living and riding in Europe since then.  In addition to riding, Wilcox has also appeared as a model for the European fashion boutique A'Dashi.

In 2006, Wilcox worked with Rick Rockefeller-Silvia and two of his stallions at the Raleigh CDI, as well as at a Pas de deux exhibition in Florida. One stallion, Lullaby, became the United States Equestrian Team's alternate for the Young Horse World Championships in 2006.

References

1966 births
Living people
American dressage riders
American female equestrians
Equestrians at the 2004 Summer Olympics
Sportspeople from Ventura County, California
Medalists at the 2004 Summer Olympics
Olympic bronze medalists for the United States in equestrian
21st-century American women